The Christ of the Lanterns is a 1958 Spanish film.

Plot 
Antonio Reyes meets Soledad, a woman from Cordoba, in the Plaza del Cristo de los Faroles. But she ignores his attention and refuse to be another of Antonios conquests.

External links

1950s Spanish-language films
1958 films
Spanish black-and-white films
1950s Spanish films